The 2020 UNOH 200 Presented by Ohio Logistics was the 17th stock car race of the 2020 NASCAR Gander RV & Outdoors Truck Series season, the 23rd iteration of the event, and the 1st race of the Playoffs and the Round of 10. The race was held on Thursday, September 17, 2020, in Bristol, Tennessee at Bristol Motor Speedway, a  permanent oval-shaped racetrack. The race took the scheduled 200 laps to complete. At race's end, Sam Mayer of GMS Racing would win his first ever race in the NASCAR Gander RV & Outdoors Truck Series. To fill the rest of the podium, Brett Moffitt of GMS Racing and Tanner Gray of DGR-Crosley would finish 2nd and 3rd, respectively.

Background 

The Bristol Motor Speedway, formerly known as Bristol International Raceway and Bristol Raceway, is a NASCAR short track venue located in Bristol, Tennessee. Constructed in 1960, it held its first NASCAR race on July 30, 1961. Despite its short length, Bristol is among the most popular tracks on the NASCAR schedule because of its distinct features, which include extraordinarily steep banking, an all concrete surface, two pit roads, and stadium-like seating. It has also been named one of the loudest NASCAR tracks.

Entry list 

*Withdrew due to damage suffered at the 2020 ToyotaCare 250.

Starting lineup 
The starting lineup was determined on a metric qualifying system based on the fastest lap and results of the 2020 ToyotaCare 250 and owner's points. As a result, Grant Enfinger of ThorSport Racing won the pole.

Race results 
Stage 1 Laps: 55

Stage 2 Laps: 55

Stage 3 Laps: 90

References 

2020 NASCAR Gander RV & Outdoors Truck Series
NASCAR races at Bristol Motor Speedway
September 2020 sports events in the United States
2020 in sports in Tennessee